Long Island (French: Isle Brûlée, Spanish: Isla Larga) is the largest island in Berkeley Sound, Falkland Islands.

During the August 1833 events in nearby Port Louis, the surviving members of Louis Vernet's settlement, seeking refuge on the nearby Hog Island to escape the murderous gang of Antonio Rivero, regularly sent their boat to Long Island for food supplies to bring cattle, pigs, and geese.

There is one listed building on the island, the Old House.

References

East Falkland
Islands of the Falkland Islands